Sudan competed at the 1972 Summer Olympics in Munich, West Germany.

Athletics

Men
Track & road events

Alternate members:
 Mashinkok Izielia Alier
 Mohamed Mahagoub Said
 Taha Kamal Eldin Mohamed

Boxing

Men

Alternate member:
 Ibrahim Abdalhamid Awad
 Mohame Hashim Ahmed
 Mustafa Awad Abbasher
 Obang Fitter Obang
 Okalo Tomsah Milwal

Football

Group B

 

 Roster - Morgan Abdelgadir Mohmed, Ahmed Abdo Mustafa, Musa Awad Nasr, Sanad Bushara Abdelnadief, Ahmed Bushra Wahba, Addelfadiel Elfadil Osman, Elnur Elnur Abdelgadir, Mohamed Elsir Abdalla, Suliman Gaafar Mohmed, Ali Hasabelrasoul Omer, Mohmed Izzeldin Adam, Ahmed Izzeldin Osman, Salim Mahmoud Said, Mohmed Mohmed Abdelfatah, Ahmed Mohmed Elbashir, Attaelmanan Mohsin, Hassan Nagmeldin, Gaksa Nasreldin Abas, and Mohmed Sharafeldin Ahmed

Weightlifting

Men

Alternate member:
 Dein Farouk Ahmed
 Mostafa Mohamed Abdelwahab
 Ramadan Mohamed Elmansour

References
Official Olympic Reports
sports-reference

Nations at the 1972 Summer Olympics
1972